In mathematics, a Shioda modular surface is one of the elliptic surfaces studied by .

References

Complex surfaces
Algebraic surfaces